Scan rate is a term used when discussing raster-scan video, describing the speed at which the image is transmitted or displayed. There are two types:
Horizontal scan rate, the number of times per second that a single horizontal line of image data is transmitted or displayed
Vertical scan rate, the number of times per second that an entire screenful of image data is transmitted or displayed, also known as "refresh rate."

Rates